Parablepharis is a genus of praying mantises in the family Hymenopodidae. It is monotypic, being represented by the single species, Parablepharis kuhlii and is found in India, Myanmar, Vietnam, Borneo, Java and Yunnan, China.

Subspecies 
The Mantodea Species File lists:
 P. kuhlii asiatica Roy, 2008
 P. kuhlii kuhlii de Haan, 1842

References

External links
Pictures on Up Close with Nature blog

Hymenopodidae
Mantodea of Asia
Insects described in 1842